André Bazin (18 April 1918 – 11 November 1958) was a renowned and influential French film critic and film theorist.

Bazin started to write about film in 1943 and was a co-founder of the renowned film magazine Cahiers du cinéma in 1951, with Jacques Doniol-Valcroze and Joseph-Marie Lo Duca.

He is notable for arguing that realism is the most important function of cinema. His call for objective reality, deep focus, and lack of montage are linked to his belief that the interpretation of a film or scene should be left to the spectator. This placed him in opposition to film theory of the 1920s and 1930s, which emphasized how the cinema could manipulate reality.

Life
Bazin was born in Angers, France in 1918. He met future film and television producer Janine Kirsch while working at Labour and Culture, a militant organization associated with the French Communist party during World War II and eventually they married in 1949 and had a son named Florent. He died in 1958, age 40, of leukemia.

Film criticism
Bazin started to write about film in 1943 and was a co-founder of the renowned film magazine Cahiers du cinéma in 1951, along with Jacques Doniol-Valcroze and Joseph-Marie Lo Duca. Bazin was a major force in post-World War II film studies and criticism.  He edited Cahiers until his death, and a four-volume collection of his writings was published posthumously, covering the years 1958 to 1962 and titled Qu'est-ce que le cinéma? (What is cinema?).

A selection from What Is Cinema? was translated into English and published in two volumes in the late 1960s and early 1970s. They became mainstays of film courses in the English-speaking world, but never were updated or revised. In 2009, the Canadian publisher Caboose, taking advantage of more favourable Canadian copyright laws, compiled fresh translations of some of the key essays from the collection in a single-volume edition. With annotations by translator Timothy Barnard, this became the only corrected and annotated edition of these writings in any language. In 2018, this volume was replaced by a more extensive collection of Bazin's texts translated by Barnard, André Bazin: Selected Writings 1943-1958. A new collection of Bazin's essays were released in 2022 under the title André Bazin on Adaptation: Cinema's Literary Imagination.

The long-held view of Bazin's critical system is that he argued for films that depicted "objective reality" (such as documentaries and films of the Italian neorealism school or as he called it "the Italian school of the Liberation"). He advocated the use of deep focus (Orson Welles, William Wyler), wide shots (Jean Renoir) and the "shot-in-depth", and preferred what he referred to as "true continuity" through mise-en-scène over experiments in editing and visual effects. For example, he extensively analyzes a scene in Wyler's The Best Years of Our Lives (with cinematography by Gregg Toland) to illuminate the function of deep-focus composition:

The concentration on objective reality, deep focus, and lack of montage are linked to Bazin's belief that the interpretation of a film or scene should be left to the spectator. This placed him in opposition to film theory of the 1920s and 1930s, which emphasized how the cinema could manipulate reality.

According to Dudley Andrew, Roman Catholicism and Personalism are two strong influences on Bazin's outlook of cinema. Victor Bruno pins that these influences—especially Roman Catholicism—are the wellspring from which flows the essence of Bazin's understanding of "realism," which, according to him, is more closely linked with metaphysical realism than with corporeality (also called realism by certain scholars).

Another academic, Tom Gunning, identifies yet a third influence on André Bazin: Hegelianism. According to Gunning, Bazin's preference for the long take is akin to Hegel's understanding of the unfolding of history in time. This idea has been dismissed by certain authors, since Bazin privileged the long take as a means of liberty and Hegel understood that the unfolding of history would conclude in a perfectly systematized paradigm.

At any rate, Bazin's personalism led him to believe that a film should represent a director's personal vision. This idea had a pivotal importance in the development of the auteur theory, the manifesto for which François Truffaut's article "A Certain Tendency of the French Cinema" was published by his mentor Bazin in Cahiers in 1954. Bazin also championed directors like Howard Hawks, William Wyler and John Ford.

In popular culture
François Truffaut dedicated The 400 Blows to Bazin, who died one day after shooting began on the film.
Richard Linklater's film Waking Life features a discussion between filmmaker Caveh Zahedi and poet David Jewell regarding some of Bazin's film theories. There is an emphasis on Bazin's Christianity and the belief that every shot is a representation of God manifested in creation.

Bibliography

In English
 Bazin, André. (2018). André Bazin: Selected Writings 1943-1958 (Timothy Barnard, Trans.) Montreal: caboose, 
 Bazin, André. (1967–1971). What is cinema? Vol. 1 & 2 (Hugh Gray, Trans., Ed.). Berkeley: University of California Press. 
 Bazin, André. (1973). Jean Renoir (François Truffaut, Ed.; W.W. Halsey II & William H. Simon, Trans.). New York: Simon and Schuster. 
 Bazin, André. (1978). Orson Welles: a critical view. New York: Harper and Row. 
 Andrew, Dudley. André Bazin.  New York: Oxford University Press, 1978. 
 Bazin, André. (1981). French cinema of the occupation and resistance: The birth of a critical esthetic (François Truffaut, Ed., Stanley Hochman, Trans.). New York: F. Ungar Pub. Co. 
 Bazin, André. (1982). The cinema of cruelty: From Buñuel to Hitchcock (François Truffaut, Ed.; Sabine d'Estrée, Trans.). New York: Seaver Books. 
 Bazin, André. (1985). Essays on Chaplin (Jean Bodon, Trans., Ed.). New Haven, Conn.: University of New Haven Press. LCCN 84-52687
 Bazin, André. (1996). Bazin at work: Major essays & reviews from the forties and fifties (Bert Cardullo, Ed., Trans.; Alain Piette, Trans.). New York: Routledge. (HB)  (PB) 
 Bazin, André. (Forthcoming). French cinema from the liberation to the New Wave, 1945-1958 (Bert Cardullo, Ed.)

In French
La politique des auteurs, edited by André Bazin. Interviews with Robert Bresson, Jean Renoir, Luis Buñuel, Howard Hawks, Alfred Hitchcock, Fritz Lang, Orson Welles, Michelangelo Antonioni, Carl Theodor Dreyer and Roberto Rossellini
Qu'est-ce que le cinéma? (4 vols.), by André Bazin, originally published 1958–1962 (1958, 1959, 1961, 1962). New edition: Les Éditions du Cerf, 2003.
André Bazin - Écrits complets (2 vol.), éditions Macula, 2018

See also
Invisible auditor

References

Further reading
The André Bazin Special Issue, Film International, No. 30 (November 2007), Jeffrey Crouse, guest editor.  Essays include those by Charles Warren ("What is Criticism?"), Richard Armstrong ("The Best Years of Our Lives: Planes of Innocence and Experience"), William Rothman ("Bazin as a Cavellian Realist"), Mats Rohdin ("Cinema as an Art of Potential Metaphors: The Rehabilitation of Metaphor in André Bazin's Realist Film Theory"), Karla Oeler ("André Bazin and the Preservation of Loss"), Tom Paulus ("The View across the Courtyard: Bazin and the Evolution of Depth Style"), and Diane Stevenson ("Godard and Bazin"). Introductory essay, "Because We Need Him Now: Re-enchanting Film Studies Through Bazin," written by Jeffrey Crouse.

External links
Archaism and Hegel in the Supply Reel - A Philosophical Look at André Bazin's Realism (article on In Media Res)
André Bazin - Divining the real (page on BFI)
André Bazin: Part 1, Film Style Theory in its Historical Context
André Bazin: Part 2, Style as a Philosophical Idea

Online essays
What Is Cinema Vol. 1 and 2 on Internet Archive
"The Life and Death of Superimposition" (1946)
"Will CinemaScope Save the Film Industry?" (1953)
André Bazin on René Clement and literary adaptation: Two original reviews

1918 births
1958 deaths
Film theorists
French film critics
French Roman Catholics
People from Angers
20th-century French male writers
École Normale Supérieure alumni
Cahiers du Cinéma editors
Deaths from leukemia
Deaths from cancer in France